Qwt or Qt Widgets for Technical Applications is a set of custom Qt widgets, GUI Components and utility classes which are primarily useful for programs with a technical background. Beside a 2D plot widget it provides scales, sliders, dials, compasses, thermometers, wheels and knobs to control or display values, arrays, or ranges of type double.

Qwt is used by Molekel.

References

Software that uses Qt